Major General Daniel Charles Spry CBE DSO CD (February 4, 1913 – April 2, 1989) was a senior Canadian Army officer who commanded the 3rd Canadian Infantry Division during Operation Veritable in World War II.

War service
In 1943, Spry commanded the 1st Battalion, The Royal Canadian Regiment and then the 1st Canadian Infantry Brigade, in Italy. In 1944, he commanded the 12th Canadian Infantry Brigade. Later, in 1944, he took charge of the 3rd Canadian Division, in northwest Europe, until the end of the Rhineland Campaign. The commander of II Canadian Corps, Guy Simonds, was dissatisfied with Spry's performance during the assaults on heavily defended woodland near Moyland, southeast of Kleve and later on the Hochwald, saying that he "lacked quick tactical appreciation and robust drive in ... urgent tactical situations". In turn, Spry felt that neither Simonds nor Crerar fully understood the situation "at the sharp end of battle". Simonds was adamant that Spry should go but Crerar was more sympathetic and he campaigned for Spry's appointment to the Canadian Reinforcement Units in Britain, appreciating Spry's ability as a trainer of soldiers (endorsed by Simonds) and the value of having a battle experienced officer in that role. Spry was relieved of command of the 3rd Division at the end of Operation Blockbuster and he duly left for Britain to command the Canadian Reinforcement Units.

Postwar
In 1946, Spry became Vice-Chief of the General Staff at National Defence HQ in Ottawa and retired later that year.

In 1969, Spry presented the Major-General D.C. Spry Trophy, an annual small arms competition for The Royal Canadian Regiment.

Scouting 

Spry became Director of the Boy Scouts World Bureau and was awarded the Bronze Wolf, the only distinction of the World Organization of the Scout Movement, awarded by the World Scout Committee for exceptional services to world Scouting, in 1961. In 1956 he also received the highest distinction of the Scout Association of Japan, the Golden Pheasant Award.

References

1913 births
1989 deaths
Burials at Beechwood Cemetery (Ottawa)
Canadian Companions of the Distinguished Service Order
Canadian Commanders of the Order of the British Empire
Recipients of the Bronze Wolf Award
Canadian Army generals of World War II
Royal Canadian Regiment officers
Canadian generals
Canadian military personnel from Manitoba